Congenital dyserythropoietic anemia type I (CDA I) is a disorder of blood cell production, particularly of
the production of erythroblasts, which are the precursors of the red blood cells (RBCs).

Presentation
Many affected individuals have yellowing of the skin and eyes (jaundice) and an enlarged liver and spleen (hepatosplenomegaly). This condition also causes the body to absorb too much iron, which builds up and can damage tissues and organs. In particular, iron overload can lead to an abnormal heart rhythm (arrhythmia), congestive heart failure, diabetes, and chronic liver disease (cirrhosis). Rarely, people with CDA type I are born with skeletal abnormalities, most often involving the fingers and/or toes.

Genetics
CDA type I is transmitted by both parents autosomal recessively and usually results from mutations in the CDAN1 gene. Little is known about the function of this gene, and it is unclear how mutations cause the characteristic features of CDA type I. Some people with this condition do not have identified mutations in the CDAN1 gene, leading researchers to believe that mutations in at least one other gene can also cause this form of the disorder.

Diagnosis
CDA type I is characterized by moderate to severe anemia. It is usually diagnosed in childhood or adolescence, although in some cases, the condition can be detected before birth.

Treatment
Treatment consists of frequent blood transfusions and chelation therapy. Potential cures include bone marrow transplantation and gene therapy.

See also
 Congenital dyserythropoietic anemia
 Thalassemia
 Hemoglobinopathy
 List of hematologic conditions

References

Further reading
  GeneReviews/NCBI/NIH/UW entry on Congenital Dyserythropoietic Anemia Type I
 Congenital dyserythropoietic anemia at the US National Institutes of Health Home Genetic Reference

External links 

Genetic disorders with no OMIM
Anemias